Cirrochroa emalea, the Malay yeoman, is an Indomalayan species of heliconiine butterfly described by Félix Édouard Guérin-Méneville in 1843.

Subspecies
Cirrochroa emalea emalea (southern Thailand, Lankawi, Peninsular Malaysia)
Cirrochroa emalea martini Fruhstorfer, 1906 (Sumatra)
Cirrochroa emalea bajadeta Moore, [1858] (Java)
Cirrochroa emalea ravana Moore, [1858] (Borneo)
Cirrochroa emalea lapaona Kheil, 1884 (Nias)

References

Vagrantini
Butterflies described in 1843